Lincroft is an unincorporated community and census-designated place (CDP) within Middletown Township, in Monmouth County, New Jersey, United States. As of the  2020 United States Census, the CDP had a population of 7,060, teflecting a 15.1% increase from the 6,135 residents enumerated at the 2010 U.S. Census, in turn a decline of 120 residents (-1.9%) from the 6,255 counted at the 2000 U.S. Census.

Geography
According to the United States Census Bureau, the CDP had a total area of 5.799 square miles (15.019 km2), including 5.580 square miles (14.452 km2) of land and 0.219 square miles (0.567 km2) of water (3.78%).

Demographics

2010 census

2000 census
As of the 2000 United States census there were 6,255 people, 2,121 households, and 1,718 families living in the CDP. The population density was 1,113.0 people per square mile (429.7/km2). There were 2,160 housing units at an average density of 384.3/sq mi (148.4/km2). The racial makeup of the CDP was 93.11% White, 0.83% African American, 0.08% Native American, 4.52% Asian, 0.66% from other races, and 0.80% from two or more races. Hispanic or Latino of any race were 2.54% of the population.

There were 2,121 households, out of which 41.6% had children under the age of 18 living with them, 73.8% were married couples living together, 5.3% had a female householder with no husband present, and 19.0% were non-families. 17.3% of all households were made up of individuals, and 12.8% had someone living alone who was 65 years of age or older. The average household size was 2.91 and the average family size was 3.31.

In the CDP the population was spread out, with 28.1% under the age of 18, 5.2% from 18 to 24, 25.4% from 25 to 44, 27.6% from 45 to 64, and 13.7% who were 65 years of age or older. The median age was 40 years. For every 100 females, there were 97.3 males. For every 100 females age 18 and over, there were 94.0 males.

The median income for a household in the CDP was $94,199, and the median income for a family was $104,972. Males had a median income of $79,177 versus $41,875 for females. The per capita income for the CDP was $37,910. About 3.0% of families and 5.6% of the population were below the poverty line, including 4.5% of those under age 18 and 14.0% of those age 65 or over.

Education
Lincroft is home to several schools, including:
 Brookdale Community College, the community college of Monmouth County
 Christian Brothers Academy is an all-boys College preparatory school with a focus on Christian education run by the Institute of the Brothers of the Christian Schools
 High Technology High School, a vocational school situated on the Brookdale Campus
 Lincroft Elementary School, a public K-5 elementary school operating under the Middletown Township Public School District
 Oak Hill Academy, a private, nonsectarian elementary school for grades K-8 founded in 1981.
 St. Leo the Great School, a private Catholic elementary school (K-8) operated by the Roman Catholic Diocese of Trenton that was recognized in 2012 by the National Blue Ribbon Schools Program.

Transportation
New Jersey Transit offers local bus service on the 833 route. NJ Transit train service on the North Jersey Coast Line is available at the Red Bank station.

Notable people

People who were born in, residents of, or otherwise closely associated with Lincroft include:
 Sebastian Bach (born 1968), hard rock singer.
 Nicole Byer, comedian.
 Vincent Favale (born 1959), co-founder of Comedy Central.
 Bob Tucker (born 1945), former football player.

References

Census-designated places in Monmouth County, New Jersey
Middletown Township, New Jersey